Luisa Sanfelice (1764-1800) was an Italian aristocrat.

 Luisa Sanfelice may also refer to:

 Luisa Sanfelice in Carcere, a painting by the Italian artist Gioacchino Toma
  Luisa Sanfelice (1942 film), an Italian film directed by Leo Menardi
  Luisa Sanfelice (2004 film), an Italian film directed by Paolo and Vittorio Taviani

See also
 La Sanfelice, an 1864 novel by the French writer Alexandre Dumas